Julien Fivaz (born 9 January 1979) is a Swiss long jumper. His personal best jump is 8.27 metres (NR), achieved in August 2003 in Ebensee.

He competed at the 2003 World Championships and the 2008 Olympic Games without reaching the final.

Competition record

References

1979 births
Living people
Swiss male long jumpers
Athletes (track and field) at the 2008 Summer Olympics
Olympic athletes of Switzerland